Clonal may refer to:

Biology
Clonal interference, a phenomenon that occurs when two (or more) beneficial mutations arise independently in different individuals in a genetically homogeneous population of an asexually reproducing organism 
Aggregating anemone, also called clonal anemone
Vegetative cloning, a form of asexual reproduction in plants
Clonal reproduction

Immunology
Clonal deletion, a process by which B cells and T cells are deactivated before act significantly upon specific antigens
Clonal selection theory, a model for how the immune system responds to infection
Clonal anergy, a lack of reaction by the body's defense mechanisms to foreign substance

See also
Clone (disambiguation)
Clonalis House
Clone (genetics)
Cloning